Sir Henry Peyton, 2nd Baronet (1779–1854), of Doddington, Cambridgeshire and Swift's House, Bicester, Oxfordshire was an English politician.

He was the eldest son of Sir Henry Peyton, 1st Baronet of Doddington, whom he succeeded in 1789. He was educated at Harrow School (1790–1795) and Christ Church, Oxford (1797–1799).

He was elected Member (MP) of the Parliament of the United Kingdom for Cambridgeshire in a by-election in May 1802 but did not stand in that year's general election. He was appointed High Sheriff of Cambridgeshire and Huntingdonshire for 1808–1809.

He was a notable carriage driver and a founder member of the Four Horse Club. He is mentioned in two novels by Georgette Heyer, The Reluctant Widow and Regency Buck.

He married Harriet, the daughter of James Fitzhugh of Portland Place, Middlesex and the widow of James Bradshaw of Portland Place. They had one surviving son, Henry.

References

1779 births
1854 deaths
People from Bicester
People from Fenland District
People educated at Harrow School
Alumni of Christ Church, Oxford
Baronets in the Baronetage of Great Britain
Members of the Parliament of the United Kingdom for English constituencies
UK MPs 1802–1806
High Sheriffs of Cambridgeshire and Huntingdonshire